1942 National Football League All-Star Game may refer to:

 1942 National Football League All-Star Game (January)
 1942 National Football League All-Star Game (December)